Flammeopellis is a fungal genus in the family Polyporaceae. It is a monotypic genus, containing the single species Flammeopellis bambusicola, found in Sichuan, China. Flammeopellis was circumscribed by Chinese mycologists Chang-Lin Zhao, Bao-Kai Cui and Yu-Cheng Dai in 2014.

References

Polyporaceae
Monotypic Polyporales genera
Fungi of China
Taxa described in 2014
Taxa named by Yu-Cheng Dai
Taxa named by Bao-Kai Cui